Johannes La Grouw  (24 August 1913 – 20 September 2011) was a Dutch-born New Zealand architect, engineer, businessman, artist and philanthropist. La Grouw developed a special patented house manufacturing system constructed of solid wood that eventually became a New Zealand icon for housing that can withstand the forces of nature, yet fit in nicely with them.

Background
La Grouw was educated at Higher Technical School for Architecture and Engineering. He was a building contractor in Amsterdam, Holland, from 1948 to 1951. He was founding director of Lockwood Buildings Ltd. He was a life member of Outward Bound Trust.

New Zealand company
La Grouw and Johannes Van Loghem (the co-founders of Lockwood Homes) began their unique company in 1951, by importing prefabricated homes from the Netherlands when Dutch migrants brought in crates of their own homes because of a building shortage. The company flourished and became a big player in the New Zealand construction industry.

Honours
In the 1991 Queen's Birthday Honours, La Grouw was appointed an Officer of the Order of the British Empire, for services to the building and construction industry.

La Grouw was inducted into the New Zealand Business Hall of Fame in 2007 for his revolutionary house construction system and contributions to business in New Zealand and abroad.

References

1913 births
2011 deaths
New Zealand businesspeople
Businesspeople from Amsterdam
Dutch emigrants to New Zealand
New Zealand Officers of the Order of the British Empire